The  are presented every year by the Honkaku Mystery Writers Club of Japan. They honor the best in honkaku (i.e. authentic, orthodox) mystery fiction and critical works published in the previous year.

Honkaku Mystery Award for Best Fiction winners 

 Nominees available in English translation
 05 (2005) - Taku Ashibe, 
 10 (2010) - Yukito Ayatsuji,

Honkaku Mystery Award for Best Critical Work winners

Honkaku Mystery Award for Lifetime Achievement winners 
The award is presented irregularly.
 01 (2001) - Tetsuya Ayukawa (Honkaku mystery writer)
 04 (2004) - Yasunobu Togawa (ja) (editor), Hideomi Uyama (ja) (editor)
 08 (2008) - Fu Chin-chuan (Hiroshi Shimazaki) (ja) (editor)

Best Foreign Honkaku Mystery of the Decade (2000-2009) 
The Best Honkaku Mystery Novel translated into Japanese in the last decade (2000–2009).
 Jack Kerley, The Death Collectors
 Shortlisted titles
 Sarah Caldwell, The Sibyl in Her Grave
 Jeffery Deaver, The Cold Moon
 Michael Connelly, Blood Work
 Thomas H. Cook, Instruments of Night
 Minette Walters, The Shape of Snakes

See also 
 Mystery Writers of Japan Award
 Japanese detective fiction
 Honkaku Mystery Best 10

References 
 Honkaku Mystery Writers Club of Japan (2010), Honkaku Misuteri Taisho Zen Senpyo 2001-2010 (本格ミステリ大賞全選評 2001-2010), Kobunsha, Tokyo

External links 
 Official English page

2001 establishments in Japan
Awards established in 2001
Mystery and detective fiction awards
Japanese literary awards